Duke of York Bay is an arm of Foxe Basin, in the Qikiqtaaluk Region of Nunavut, Canada. It is located in northeastern Southampton Island. The bay is directly south of the southern end of White Island, with Comer Strait at the western entrance and Falcon Strait at the eastern entrance.

History
Sir William Edward Parry and his crew gave the bay its name on 17 August 1821 during his second voyage for the discovery of a Northwest Passage from the Atlantic to the Pacific, in honour of Prince Frederick, Duke of York and Albany, having first entered the bay the day before, 16 August 1821, the Duke's birthday.

In January 1996, Duke of York Bay was selected by delegates from across Nunavut as the site of the first bowhead whale hunt in Nunavut's waters. When the Nunavut Wildlife Management Board switched the location to Repulse Bay the following month, the community of Coral Harbour, south of Duke of York Bay, was angered with the decision. Some thought it was politically motivated, others said that elders felt the ice conditions and strong currents in the bay would make for a difficult beaching.

References

Bays of the Arctic Ocean
Bays of Foxe Basin